The Daily Unidade Real de Valor, or URV (Portuguese, Real Value Unit), was a non-monetary reference currency (i.e., non-fiat) created in March 1994, as part of the Plano Real in Brazil. It was the most theoretically sophisticated piece of the Plano Real and was based on a previous academic work by Pérsio Arida and André Lara Resende, the "Larida Plan", published in 1984.

Its main purpose was to establish a parallel currency to the cruzeiro real, free from the effects of inertial inflation on the latter, which exceeded 1,200% per year prior to the implementation of the new currency, the real.

It was conceived as a temporary instrument to break up the "psychological inertia" that had ingrained in the Brazilian mindset and which caused prices to keep rising as a consequence of subjective estimation of inflation or preemptive adjustment without cost assessment. These phenomena are among the chief characteristics of hyperinflation, resulting from the erosion of confidence on the legal tender. The idea was to let the old currency (the cruzeiro real) fully absorb the effects of hyperinflation while having a new currency to be stable (in nominal terms) by adjusting its exchange rate against the old one.

URVs were quoted in cruzeiros reais and its intrinsic value was pegged to three price indices and had a fixed parity of 1-to-1 to the daily U.S. dollar exchange rate. The exchange rate of URVs to cruzeiros reais was recalculated and published daily by the government.

Prices were quoted both in URVs and cruzeiros reais, but payments had to be made exclusively in cruzeiros reais, since the URV would not become legal tender until July 1, 1994. For instance, banks were required to report balances on accounts in both currencies and contracts had to be rewritten to express prices in URVs.

The URV was extinguished on July 1, 1994, when it was converted to a new currency, the real, at parity (i.e., 1 real = 1 URV = CR$2,750), effectively breaking the hyperinflationary cycle, bringing stability to the Brazilian currency.

The implementation of the new currency was one of the greatest currency changes in known history, with almost the entirety of the country's legal tender replaced in about 45 days.

See also
 Constant Purchasing Power Accounting
 Inflation accounting
 International Financial Reporting Standards
 Indexed unit of account

References

External links
 How Fake Money Saved Brazil

Currencies of Brazil